Titanium carbide, TiC, is an extremely hard (Mohs 9–9.5) refractory ceramic material, similar to tungsten carbide.  It has the appearance of black powder with the sodium chloride (face-centered cubic) crystal structure.

It occurs in nature as a form of the very rare mineral khamrabaevite - (Ti,V,Fe)C. It was discovered in 1984 on Mount Arashan in the Chatkal District, USSR (modern Kyrgyzstan), near the Uzbek border. The mineral was named after Ibragim Khamrabaevich Khamrabaev, director of Geology and Geophysics of Tashkent, Uzbekistan. Its crystals as found in nature range in size from 0.1 to 0.3 mm.

Physical properties
Titanium carbide has an elastic modulus of approximately 400 GPa and a shear modulus of 188 GPa.

Manufacturing and machining
Tool bits without tungsten content can be made of titanium carbide in nickel-cobalt matrix cermet, enhancing the cutting speed, precision, and smoothness of the workpiece.

The resistance to wear, corrosion, and oxidation of a tungsten carbide–cobalt material can be increased by adding 6–30% of titanium carbide to tungsten carbide. This forms a solid solution that is more brittle and susceptible to breakage.

Titanium carbide can be etched with reactive-ion etching.

Applications 
Titanium carbide is used in preparation of cermets, which are frequently used to machine steel materials at high cutting speed.  It is also used as an abrasion-resistant surface coating on metal parts, such as tool bits and watch mechanisms. Titanium carbide is also used as a heat shield coating for atmospheric reentry of spacecraft.

7075 aluminium alloy (AA7075) is almost as strong as steel, but weighs one third as much. Using thin AA7075 rods with TiC nanoparticles allows larger alloys pieces to be welded without phase-segregation induced cracks.

See also 
 Metallocarbohedryne, a family of metal-carbon clusters including

References

Carbides
Ceramic materials
Refractory materials
Superhard materials
Titanium(IV) compounds
Rock salt crystal structure